Cynet may be:

 Cynetart, an arts festival
 CYNET, the NREN (National Research & Education Network) of Cyprus
Cynet, a cyber security company from Israel.